Jemalong Shire was a local government area in the Central West region of New South Wales, Australia.

Jemalong  Shire was proclaimed on 7 March 1906. Its offices were based in the town of Forbes, New South Wales.

The Local Government Areas Amalgamation Act 1980 saw the amalgamation of Jemalong Shire with the Municipality of Forbes to form Forbes Shire on 1 January 1981.

References

Former local government areas of New South Wales
1906 establishments in Australia
1981 disestablishments in Australia